Motormouth: Bob Ostertag Plays the Buchla 200e is the ninth studio album by Bob Ostertag, released on February 1, 2011 by Seeland Records.

Track listing

Personnel
Adapted from the Motormouth: Bob Ostertag Plays the Buchla 200e liner notes.

Musicians
 Bob Ostertag – Buchla 200e synthesizer

Production and design
 Alex Culang – cover art, design
 Thomas Dimuzio – mastering (5)

Release history

References

External links 
 Motormouth: Bob Ostertag Plays the Buchla 200e at Bandcamp
 

2011 albums
Bob Ostertag albums